The Shapai Dam is an arch dam on the Caopo River in Wenchuan County, Ngawa, Sichuan Province, China. The power station contains 2 x 18 MW generators with a combined capacity of 36 MW.

See also 

 List of power stations in China

References

Hydroelectric power stations in Sichuan
Dams in China
Arch dams
Dams completed in 2002
2002 establishments in China
Roller-compacted concrete dams